In mathematics, a quadratic algebra is a filtered algebra generated by degree one elements, with defining relations of degree 2. It was pointed out by Yuri Manin that such algebras play an important role in the theory of quantum groups. The most important class of graded quadratic algebras is Koszul algebras.

Definition 

A graded quadratic algebra A is determined by a vector space of generators V = A1 and a subspace of homogeneous quadratic relations S ⊂ V ⊗ V . Thus

 

and inherits its grading from the tensor algebra T(V). 

If the subspace of relations is instead allowed to  also contain inhomogeneous degree 2 elements,  i.e. S ⊂ k ⊕ V ⊕ (V ⊗ V), this construction results in a filtered quadratic algebra.

A graded quadratic algebra A as above admits a quadratic dual: the quadratic algebra generated by V* and with quadratic relations forming the orthogonal complement of S in V* ⊗ V*.

Examples 

 Tensor algebra, symmetric algebra and exterior algebra of a finite-dimensional vector space are graded quadratic (in fact, Koszul) algebras.
 Universal enveloping algebra of a finite-dimensional Lie algebra is a filtered quadratic algebra.

References 

 
 

Algebras